The Calcutta Boys' School is an independent private day school located in Kolkata (Calcutta), West Bengal. was founded by the Rev. James Mills Thoburn (Methodist Missionary to India, and later Missionary Bishop of the Methodist Episcopal Church), and was opened in 1877. It was endowed by Robert Laidlaw and others interested in the education of the sons of the Anglo-Indian and domiciled European community.

History

The origins of CBS are closely linked with the establishment of the Methodist Episcopal Church in India. In January 1873, the Reverend William Taylor founded the work of the Thoburn Methodist Episcopal Church in Calcutta (Kolkata).  He was succeeded by the Reverend James Mills Thoburn. The latter's ardent preaching soon rendered the Entally Baptist Chapel unable to cope with the increasing number of converts. In February 1874, a new chapel was opened at 145 Dharmatala Street, built at a cost of 16,000 rupees largely due to the generosity of George Bowen of Bombay who donated 10,000 rupees. Soon even this chapel proved unable to accommodate the growing congregation, until a larger church was constructed on Dharamtolla Street, where it stands today. The New Thoburn Church was dedicated on 31 December 1875. In 1888 Rev. James Mills Thoburn was elected Missionary Bishop of India and Malaysia - the first ever Missionary Bishop in India.

It was Bishop Thoburn who founded the Calcutta Boys' School. First located at Mott Lane, and then later housed in a room on Corporation Street (known as S. N. Banerjee Road today), the school struggled for survival without a building of its own. It acquired a permanent residence in 1893 thanks to the generosity of a man who could be regarded as the chief patron of the school: Sir Robert Laidlaw, founder of the 'Whiteaway, Laidlaw & Company'.

The school now has four houses named under the founder, benefactors and well-wishers; Thoburn (Red), Laidlaw (Green), Warne (Yellow) and Henderson (Blue). 
 
During Clifford Hicks' (educationist) time as Principal & Secretary, the middle building that currently houses the CBS Chapel Hall was built. Named the 'Fritchley Building', the construction was made possible by the retirement benefit and gratuity of Mr. Horace Christopher Fritchley, former Principal (1931-1951), which he donated to "his very dear CBS" together with donations collected by the students of the school. The school library (now housed in the old Physics lab) is named "The Clifford Hicks Memorial Library". The CBS Archives (established in 2008) is housed in the old Library.

Gilbert Samuel, who became Principal in 1997, furthered the cause of co-curricular activities, allowing the students of CBS to secure top positions at premier National and International contests regularly, including a second-place finish at the 2003 Biology Olympiad and the International Informatics Olympiad in 2004. In 2005 CBS won the under-16 national cricket tournament, and in 2004 the national rounds of the Inter School Frank Antony Memorial Debate.

Raja McGee, who became Principal in 2007, introduced the USO - United Students Organisation (an elected Students Council) and the DIA (Department for Innovation and Assessment). The language Festival "Lingua Fiesta" and the science festival "COSMA" (Computer, Science & Maths festival) was also introduced in the same year.

During his tenure as Principal & Secretary of the CBS, he established branch campuses at Sonarpur in 2008, Beliaghata in 2010 and Asansol (East Burdwan) in 2015.

The new additions are the West End building (built in 2017) and a magnificent colonial building, called the "Commemoration Building", housing state of the art science & computer laboratories, cafeteria, gymnasium, Board Room and class rooms which was inaugurated on April 10, 2018 by His Excellency Shri. Keshri Nath Tripathi, Hon’ble Governor of West Bengal, amidst great celebrations.
A Basketball court has also been constructed on the campus.

The school offers courses in Science, Commerce and Humanities (started in 2019) for the students enrolling in ISC.

Notable alumni
 
 
Chandrajit Banerjee, Director General - Confederation of Indian Industry
Protik Prakash Banerjee, Indian Judge
Sasthi Brata, Writer
Swapan Kumar Chakravorty, former Director of National Library of India
Purbayan Chatterjee, Sitarist
Utpal Chatterjee, Cricketer
Rusi Jeejeebhoy, Cricketer
Altamas Kabir, former Chief Justice of India
Amit Mitra, Finance Minister of West Bengal
Rudrangshu Mukherjee, Editor, The Telegraph
Gaurav Pandey, Filmmaker
Ashok Som, Associate Dean, ESSEC Business School
Benjamin Walker, Writer
Prakash Panangaden, Professor, McGill University
Saswata Gopal Mukherji , Public Prosecutor, Calcutta High Court

Gallery

References

External links

Boys' schools in India
Christian schools in West Bengal
Primary schools in West Bengal
High schools and secondary schools in Kolkata
Educational institutions established in 1877
1877 establishments in India